The Nona Tapes is a 1995 mockumentary by the American rock band Alice in Chains directed by Rocky Schenck to promote the band's self-titled album. Released on VHS on December 12, 1995, it features journalist Nona Weisbaum (played by Jerry Cantrell) interviewing the band in Seattle and also includes the music video for the album's lead single, "Grind", and outtake footage overdubbed with the second single, "Heaven Beside You". The Nona Tapes became a cult hit despite Columbia Records not liking it at first. It peaked at No. 23 on Billboard's Top Video Sales and at No. 25 on the Top Music Videos chart. Because it is no longer for sale, original copies of the VHS are considered a rarity. However, in 2006, Best Buy offered a DVD version for free for a limited time with purchases of the compilation The Essential Alice in Chains. On June 19, 2017, Alice in Chains' official Vevo channel uploaded the video on YouTube.

Plot 
The Nona Tapes follows aspiring journalist Nona Weisbaum (played by guitarist Jerry Cantrell) on her quest to "find some Seattle rock stars" for a breakthrough story. Throughout the video, Weisbaum scours the streets of Seattle and eventually finds and interviews all members of Alice in Chains (besides Cantrell). Entwined between Nona's segments are interviews revealing the lives of the band members, and interview footage regarding the self-titled album.

Cast 
 Jerry Cantrell as himself / Nona Weisbaum
 Layne Staley as himself
 Sean Kinney as himself
 Mike Inez as himself
 Rocky Schenck as himself
 Katherine Shaw as interviewer

Music listing
 "Brush Away" Excerpt 1
 "Brush Away" Excerpt 2
 "Over Now" Excerpt 1
 "Over Now" Excerpt 2
 "Grind" Excerpt
 "Over Now" Excerpt 3
 "Head Creeps" Excerpt 
 "Heaven Beside You" Excerpt 
 "Grind" (Music Video)
 "Heaven Beside You" (Outtake footage)

Production 
To help promote their self-titled album, Columbia Records asked Alice in Chains to do an EPK (Electronic Press Kit), a common marketing tool in the '90s in which they should talk about themselves, but they did not want to do that. The band took the money from the label and made the mockumentary The Nona Tapes instead. Directed by Rocky Schenck, it features Jerry Cantrell disguised as a female journalist, Nona Weisbaum, interviewing his bandmates playing fictionalized versions of themselves during a car ride in Seattle. The music video for "Grind" is also featured at the end. Columbia did not like The Nona Tapes at first and told the band they had wasted their money doing it. However, it became a cult hit and Columbia decided to sell it, but the band was against it. The video was eventually released on VHS in December 1995. In 2006, The Nona Tapes was released on DVD and came as a bonus with the compilation The Essential Alice in Chains.

Nona Weisbaum made a special appearance for Alice In Chains' tribute at MoPOP's Founders Award on December 1, 2020.

Chart positions

References

External links

Alice in Chains: The Nona Tapes on YouTube

Alice in Chains
Alice in Chains video albums
1990s English-language films
1995 video albums
American mockumentary films